Belledonne is a mountain range in the Dauphiné Alps (part of the French Alps) in southeast France. The southern end of the range forms the eastern wall of the mountains that surround the city of Grenoble.

The range is noted for the spectacular scenery it provides the inhabitants of Grenoble, numerous ski areas, interesting geology, and a diverse range of alpine land types and uses.

Geography
The highest point is the Grand Pic de Belledonne, .

The range is delineated by several valleys which lie at relatively low altitude, including the Grésivaudan Valley (which carries the Isère) on the west, the river Arc to the north and the Romanche to the south.

Geologically, Belledonne is a concatenation of ranges which are not physically separated; from north to south, these are: the Grand Arc, the Lauzière, the Sept-Laux, Belledonne proper, and the Taillefer.

Belledonne is a crystalline range. It initiated as a Paleozoic peneplain which was covered by Mesozoic sediments, then raised and tilted during the Tertiary uplift of the Alps and subjected to glacial erosion during the Quaternary. As a result of its geologic history, Belledonne alternates jagged peaks with gentle slopes.

Hence, all alpine vegetation zones are represented: 
 Hill zone: coppices of Downy oak on South facing slopes, hornbeam, common maple.
 Montane zone: beech, birch, aspen, English oak, sycamore maple, goat willow, then fir and spruce.
 Subalpine zone: moors and sparse stands of spruce, mugho pine, stone pine, and silver birch.
 Alpine zone: grassland, scree and rock.

A significant feature is the Belledonne Balcony,  a terrace or plateau some 30 km long on the western side of the range that provides a relatively level area intersected by narrow ravines eroded by rivers taking runoff from the snow levels higher up. The Balcony has supported diverse livestock-raising and other agricultural activity for a considerable period of time, and its Southern part is now effectively an upscale suburb of Grenoble.

Main summits

Main glaciers

Glacier de la Sitre
Glacier de Freydane
Glacier de l'Amiante
Glacier du Rocher Blanc
Glacier de la Combe Madame
Glacier de l'Argentière
Glacier d'Arguille
Glacier du Puy Gris
Glacier du Gleyzin
Glacier de Claran

Main passes
No road cuts across Belledonne. The Pas de la Coche pass, between Belledonne proper and the 7 Laux range, is the only natural break point in the range, and is the only point below  on the Belledonne ridge (the main water divide between the Isère and the Romanche). Most other passes are not much lower in elevation than their neighboring peaks. At the turn of the 20th century, Joseph Paganon, a minister in several French governments, pushed for linking Laval to the Rivier-d'Allemond by road through the Pas de la Coche. Before the automobile era, locals frequently used this pass  to go from Gresivaudan to the Eau d'Olle valley, or to continue to the Maurienne valley via the Glandon pass. Hannibal may have passed the Pas de la Coche when he crossed the Alps with his army.

Main lakes

Belledonne and its lakes have played a major role in industrializing hydroelectricity production as early as 1869 thanks to pioneer Aristide Bergès and his paper mills which tapped water from lake Crozet.

Ski resorts
There are 4 main ski resorts in Belledonne, from South to North:

 Chamrousse
 Le Collet d'Allevard
 Les Sept Laux
 L'Espace Nordique du Barioz

Origin of the name
The origin of the name is not clear. The phrase belle donne means beautiful women in Italian. It does not appear to mean that in Arpitan, and since Arpitan is the ancient regional language, would have been a more likely source of ancient names than Italian. Nevertheless, from one angle the highest peak, the Grand Pic du Belledonne allegedly looks like a woman holding a baby. Other suggested derivations are from the Celtic donne meaning valley, hence beautiful valleys, or indo-European bal, meaning elevated rock, which evolved into bel, then belle. It is difficult without evidence to determine the validity of these derivations.

Fauna
The mountains are home to marmots, chamois, ibex mountain goats and grouse. Reportedly, wolves have returned since 1998, coming from Italy and the press regularly echoes complaints from shepherds about wolves attacking their sheep.

The ibex had completely disappeared from Belledonne. Early 1983, 13 females and 7 males were brought in from Switzerland and by spring 2002, their population had risen to 900 heads.

Gallery

References
The Alps Geology site is an excellent source for geological information on the Belledonne Range and on all of the French Alps.

Mountain ranges of the Alps
Mountain ranges of Auvergne-Rhône-Alpes